Sir Coplestone Warwick Bampfylde, 3rd Baronet (c. 1689 – 7 October 1727) of Poltimore and North Molton, Devon, was a British landowner and High Tory politician who sat in the House of Commons from 1710 to 1727.

Origins

Bampfylde was the eldest son of Colonel Hugh Bampfylde (c. 1663–1691) (son and heir apparent of Sir Coplestone Bampfylde, 2nd Baronet (c. 1633–1692), whom he predeceased) and his wife Mary Clifford, daughter of James Clifford of Ware. He matriculated at Christ Church, Oxford on 26 January 1708, aged 18. His father died in a fall from his horse in 1691 and in 1692 he succeeded his grandfather Sir Coplestone Bampfylde, 2nd Baronet (c. 1633–1692) as 3rd baronet. His mother protected him in his infancy against lawsuits challenging his property rights.

Career
At the 1710 general election, Bampfylde was returned unopposed as MP for Exeter.  He was then returned unopposed as MP for Devon at the 1713 general election. He was returned unopposed again at the 1715 general election and voted against the Government in all divisions. During The Fifteen, he was suspected of Jacobite sympathies and was temporarily imprisoned. He was also mentioned in the seventh report of the South Sea Company inquiry as having accepted £1,000 stock in the company on 22 March 1720 without paying for it. At the 1722 general election he was again returned unopposed for Devon and sat until his death in 1727.

Inheritance
As well as having inherited his grandfather's extensive Devonshire estates, including Poltimore and North Molton, Bampfylde also inherited the estates of his distant cousin Warwick Bampfylde (1623–1695) of Hardington, Somerset (5th in descent from Peter Bampfylde of Hardington, younger brother of Sir William I Bampfylde (died 1474) of Poltimore), to whom he acted as executor.

Marriage and children

In June 1716 Bampfylde married Gertrude Carew, daughter of Sir John Carew, 3rd Baronet (died 1692) of Antony, Cornwall. They had two daughters and a son and heir Sir Richard Warwick Bampfylde, 4th Baronet (1722–1767).

Death and succession
Bampfylde died on 7 October 1727 and was buried at Poltimore a week later. He was succeeded in the baronetcy by his son Sir Richard Bampfylde, 4th Baronet (1722–1767).

References

External links
 Burial record on findagrave.com

1680s births
1727 deaths
Alumni of Christ Church, Oxford
Baronets in the Baronetage of England
British MPs 1710–1713
British MPs 1713–1715
British MPs 1715–1722
British MPs 1722–1727
Members of the Parliament of Great Britain for Exeter
Members of the Parliament of Great Britain for Devon